"Muero Por Amarte" is a song by Colombian recording artist Naëla. It served as  Naëla' second single from her debut studio album, Naëla (2011). Written by Naëla and produced by Naëla, "Muero Por Amarte" was released on March 21, 2011. "Muero Por Amarte" received generally favorable reviews from critics, who praised its composition.

Credits and personnel 
Credits for "Muero Por Amarte" are taken from the single's liner notes.

Naëla – lead vocals, background vocals
Naëla – producer
Naëla – songwriting, background vocals

References

External links 
 "Muero Por Amarte" - Official Music Video

Naëla songs
2011 singles